William Edward Muncey (November 12, 1928 – October 18, 1981) was an American hydroplane racing legend from Detroit, Michigan. The International Motorsports Hall of Fame and hydroplane historian Dan Cowie described Muncey as "without question, the greatest hydroplane racer in history." Muncey was nicknamed "Mr. Unlimited" and won 62 races, which was the most races in the history of the sport until Dave Villwock broke his record in 2011.

Racing career
Muncey began his boat racing career in 1949 by sinking in front of a hometown crowd on the Detroit River. Muncey's first attempt to drive in an American Power Boat Association (APBA) Gold Cup event began by blowing up the engine. Muncey went to Gar Wood’s riverfront mansion, and asked Wood for help. Muncey got an engine from Wood, but the bottom of the boat fell out during the next race.

Muncey had his first win at the Gold Cup in 1956 in Miss Thriftway. He followed that with another Gold Cup win in 1957, again in Miss Thriftway. In 1960, Muncey won fourteen races between 1960 and 1962, including six of seven in 1962. In 1976, at age 48, he won five races in his boat Atlas Van Lines to silence the critics that said that he was too old to win. He moved to a new Atlas Van Lines boat in 1977 and won twenty times in the next three seasons. Muncey attributed much of his success to his close friend and an accomplished aeronautical engineer, D.J. Nolan, Sr. of Bloomfield Hills, Michigan. He followed up with four wins in 1980. Muncey won his last race during the Thunder on the Ohio race at Evansville in 1981. Muncey was leading the final heat of the World Championship race at Acapulco on  when he died in a blowover crash while travelling  He was buried at Glen Abbey Memorial Park in 

In more than three decades of hydroplane racing, Muncey had claimed eight Gold Cups (1956, 1957, 1961, 1962, 1972, 1977, 1978, 1979), seven U.S. National Championships (1960, 1961, 1962, 1972, 1976, 1978, 1979), and four World Championships (1968, 1969, 1972, and 1980). He was named the driver of the year seven times.

As owners, the Muncey family won six High Points Champions (1976, 1978, 1979, 1982, 1983, 1985), with his widow Fran retaining the team with the Atlas Van Lines "Blue Blaster" brand until the end of the 1984 season, when Miller Brewing Company took over sponsorship in 1985 as the Miller American, with the 1988 season being branded as Miller High Life, as part of a deal between NASCAR driver Bobby Allison and his friend Sam Bass where Miller rebranded all motorsport under the High Life brand using a Bass-designed livery for all motorsport sponsored by Miller. Chip Hanauer drove the Muncey operation throughout her control before the team was bought out by Circus Circus at the end of the

Awards
Muncey was inducted in the International Motorsports Hall of Fame in 2004.
He was inducted in the Motorsports Hall of Fame of America in 1989 in the Power Boats category. His widow Fran was also inducted in the hall in 2021 for her accomplishments as a solo owner after his death.
Muncey was awarded the National Marine Manufacturers Association Hall of Fame Award in 1988.
The H1 Unlimited High Points Championship Driver's Trophy is named for Muncey, as of 2011.

Personal life
Muncey graduated from Royal Oak High School in Michigan in 1947. He attended Rollins College in Winter Park, Florida, where he was initiated as a member of Lambda Chi Alpha fraternity. He was twice married and had four children.

Biography

References

External links

H1 Unlimited
1928 births
1981 deaths
American motorboat racers
International Motorsports Hall of Fame inductees
Hydroplanes
Racing motorboats
Motorboat racers who died while racing
Sport deaths in Mexico
APBA Challenge Cup